Turf was a cigarette brand which was produced during the 1950s in the German Democratic Republic. Turf was sold in 20, 10 and 5-packs. She produced by the traditional "Zigarettenfabrik Jasmatzi", later "VEB Jasmatzi Dresden", which in 1959 merged into the "Vereinigten Zigarettenfabriken Dresden" in Dresden.

History
In 1956, a 20-pack cost 2.00 Deutsche Mark, a 10-pack cost 1.00 mark and a 5-pack cost 50 Pfennig. Turf comes in dark green packaging with a white lettering and white pack with green lettering.

Slogan
A once popular slogan relating to this cigarette brand was "You can see the tombs in the Valley - the smokers of turf and real are." The brand name Turf was also an abbreviation of "Thuringia under Russian thumb" or reinterpreted to "daily under Russian thumb" outside of Thuringia.

References

Cigarette brands